Monika Lundi is a German television and film actress.

Selected filmography
  (1968, TV film)
  (1968)
  (1968)
  (1968, TV miniseries)
  (1969)
 Der Kommissar: Dr. Meinhardts trauriges Ende (1970, TV series episode)
  (1971, TV series)
 The Captain (1971)
 The Heath Is Green (1972)
  (1973)
 Crazy – Completely Mad (1973)
 No Gold for a Dead Diver (1974)
 Tatort: Kindergeld (1982, TV series episode)
 Ein Fall für zwei: Tödliches Viereck (1983, TV series episode)
 Alle meine Töchter (1995–2001, TV series)

References

External links
 

1943 births
German film actresses
Actresses from Berlin
Living people
German television actresses
20th-century German actresses